Shire is a traditional Somali name.

Given name
Shire Haji Farah, the current Minister of Finance of the Puntland region of Somalia.
Shire Jama Ahmed, was a Somali linguist who is credited with having devised a unique Latin script for transcribing the Somali language.

Surname
Abdisamad Ali Shire, former Vice-President of the Puntland region of Somalia.
Barre Adan Shire Hiiraale, former Minister of Defense of Somalia.
Hussein Shire, a Somali entrepreneur.
Mohamoud Ali Shire, the 26th Sultan of the Warsangali Sultanate, reigning from 1897 to 1960.
Said Hassan Shire, current Speaker of the Puntland regional parliament.
Warsan Shire, British-Somali poet.
Abdi Shire Warsame, former Somali ambassador to Iran and Kenya. 
Ali Shire Warsame, former Somali politician and businessmen.
Warsame Shire Awale, a prominent Somali poet, playwright and songwriter.

Somali masculine given names
Somali given names